Robert Baldwin Hayward (7 March 1829 – 2 February 1903) was an English educator and mathematician.

Life
Born on 7 March 1829, at Bocking, Essex, he was son of Robert Hayward by his wife Ann Baldwin; his father, from an old Quaker family, withdrew from the Quaker community on his marriage. Educated at University College, London, entered St John's College, Cambridge, in 1846, graduating as fourth wrangler in 1850. He was fellow from 30 March 1852 till 27 March 1860, and from 1852 till 1855 assistant tutor.

From 1855 Baldwin was mathematical tutor and reader in natural philosophy at Durham University, leaving in 1859 to become a mathematical master at Harrow School. Hayward remained at Harrow till 1893, a period of 35 years. He reformed mathematics teaching there. He was president (1878–89) of the Association for the Improvement of Geometrical Teaching (afterwards the Mathematical Association).

Hayward was a mountain climber and an original member of the Alpine Club from its foundation in 1858, withdrawing in 1865.  He died at Shanklin, Isle of Wight, on 2 February 1903.

Works
Baldwin published in 1895 a pamphlet, Hints on teaching Arithmetic. He was author of a text-book on Elementary Solid Geometry (1890) and The Algebra of Coplanar Vectors and Trigonometry (1899). In pure mathematics he published papers in the Transactions of the Cambridge Philosophical Society and the Quarterly Journal of Mathematics. He was elected Fellow of the Royal Society on 1 June 1876, in recognition of his work on the method of moving axes. He is known also for an article "Proportional Representation" in the Nineteenth century (February 1884).

Family
Hayward married in 1860 Marianne, daughter of Henry Rowe, of Cambridge; his wife's sister married Henry William Watson. He had issue two sons and four daughters, including Sir Maurice Henry Weston Hayward, K.C.S.I., colonial administrator in India.

Notes

Attribution

1829 births
1903 deaths
19th-century English mathematicians
Alumni of St John's College, Cambridge
Fellows of St John's College, Cambridge
Fellows of the Royal Society
People from Bocking, Essex
Academics of Durham University